John Hais Hardee Sr. (November 4, 1747April 3, 1809) was an American military officer and planter who served in the Continental Army during the American Revolutionary War. Initially a private, he was promoted to colonel. In recognition of his services, the State of Georgia granted him  of land in Camden County in 1786, on which he built the Rural Felicity Plantation.

Early life and career 
Hardee was born in 1747 in Pitt County, North Carolina, to John H. Hardee and Susannah Tyson. His father, the son of Anthony Hardee and Evelyn Dulverton, was one of the founders of Pitt County, and was also colonel in the American Revolutionary War. He married Caroline T. Aldrich, firstly, in 1770, then Elizabeth Burney. One of his children was John Hais Hardee Jr., who became a major in the United States Army during the War of 1812.

Death 
Hardee died in 1809 in Camden County, Georgia, aged 61. He was interred in the family burial ground at the Rural Felicity Plantation.

References 

1747 births
1809 deaths
American slave owners
Continental Army officers from the Thirteen Colonies
People from Pitt County, North Carolina